Sorolopha bryana is a moth of the family Tortricidae. The species was first described by Cajetan Felder, Rudolf Felder and Alois Friedrich Rogenhofer in 1875. It is found in Sri Lanka.

References

Moths of Asia
Moths described in 1875